Colm Tóibín  (approximately ; born 30 May 1955) is an Irish novelist, short story writer, essayist, journalist, critic, playwright and poet.

His first novel, The South, was published in 1990. The Blackwater Lightship was shortlisted for the Booker Prize. The Master (a fictionalised version of the inner life of Henry James) was also shortlisted for the Booker Prize and won the 2006 International Dublin Literary Award, securing for Toíbín a bounty of thousands of euro as it is one of the richest literary awards in the world. Nora Webster won the Hawthornden Prize, whilst The Magician (a fictionalised version of the life of Thomas Mann) won the Folio Prize. His fellow artists elected him to Aosdána and he won the  "UK and Ireland Nobel" David Cohen Prize in 2021.

He succeeded Martin Amis as professor of creative writing at the University of Manchester. He was appointed Chancellor of the University of Liverpool in 2017. He is now Irene and Sidney B. Silverman Professor of the Humanities at Columbia University in Manhattan.

Early years
Tóibín was born in 1955 in Enniscorthy, County Wexford, in the southeast of Ireland. He was reared in Parnell Avenue. His parents were Bríd and Michael Tóibín. He is one of the two youngest children in his family, alongside his brother Niall. His grandfather, Patrick Tobin, participated in the Easter Rising in April 1916, and was subsequently interned at Frongoch in Wales, while an uncle was involved in the IRB during the Irish Civil War. Following the foundation of the Irish Free State in 1922, Tóibín's family favoured the Fianna Fáil political party.

Tóibín grew up in a home where there was, he said, "a great deal of silence". Unable to read until the age of nine, he also developed a stammer. When he was eight years of age, in 1963, his father became ill and his mother – sending her two youngest children to stay with an aunt in County Kildare – abandoned them for three months, so that she could escort their father to Dublin, where he could be cared for. Tóibín traces the stammer he developed to this time – a stammer which would often leave him unable to speak his own name, and which he retained throughout his life. Tóibín's father – who worked as a schoolteacher – died in 1967, when his son was twelve years of age.

Tóibín received his secondary education at St Peter's College, Wexford, where he was a boarder between 1970 and 1972. He later spoke of finding some of the priests attractive. He was also an altar boy in his youth.

Tóibín went to University College Dublin (UCD), first attending history and English lectures there in 1972, before graduating with a BA in 1975. He thought about becoming a civil servant but decided against this. Instead, he left Ireland for Barcelona in 1975, later commenting: "I arrive the 24th of September, 1975. Franco dies 20th November". The city would later feature in some of Tóibín's early work: his first novel, 1990's The South, has two characters meeting in Barcelona. His 1990 non-fiction work Homage to Barcelona also references the city in its title.

Tóibín left Barcelona in 1978 and came back to Ireland. He began writing for In Dublin. Tóibín became editor of the monthly news magazine Magill in 1982, and remained in the position until 1985. He left due to a dispute with Vincent Browne, Magills managing director. In 1997, when The New Yorker asked Tóibín to write about Seamus Heaney becoming President of Ireland, Tóibín noted that Heaney's popularity could survive the "kiss of death" of an endorsement by Conor Cruise O'Brien. The New Yorker telephoned Conor Cruise O'Brien to confirm that this was so, but Cruise O'Brien disagreed and the statement could not be corroborated.

Personal life
Tóibín identifies himself as gay. Since  2012, Tóibín has been in a relationship with a man who lives in Los Angeles, and whose name he prefers not to disclose. He has served as a curator of exhibits for the Manhattan-based Morgan Library & Museum. He has judged both the Griffin Poetry Prize and the Giller Prize. Tóibín does not watch television, and his awareness of British parliamentary politics can be summed up by his admission that he thought Ed Balls was a nickname for the then Labour Party leader Ed Miliband. He is interested in tennis and plays the game for leisure; upon meeting Roger Federer, Tóibín enquired as to his opinion on the second serve.

As of 2008, he had family in Enniscorthy, including two sisters (Barbara, Nuala) and a brother (Brendan).

Tóibín lives in Southside Dublin City's Upper Pembroke Street, where on occasions his friends — such as playwright Tom Murphy and former Gate Theatre director Michael Colgan — assembled for social interaction and entertainment.
Tóibín spent his thousands of euro in prize money from his 2006 International Dublin Literary Award on building a house near Blackwater, County Wexford, where he holidayed as child. He filled this house with artworks and expensive furniture and has someone in to keep it clean it for him. He possesses a personal key to the private gated park at Dublin's Fitzwilliam Square, which is shut to ordinary members of the public.

In 2019, Tóibín spoke about having survived testicular cancer which spread to multiple organs including a lung, liver and lymph node.

Influences
Henry James, he is especially fond of The Portrait of a Lady, The Wings of the Dove, The Ambassadors, and The Golden Bowl.

Thomas Mann, he is especially fond of Buddenbrooks — which he first read in his late teens — and has also read The Magic Mountain, Doctor Faustus and the novella Death in Venice.

Tóibin's non-fiction was influenced by Joan Didion and Norman Mailer. He said decades after the publication of his debut novel (The South), "If you look at it, you see that the sentence structure is more or less taken from Didion", and expressed reservations about its quality.

In July 1972, aged 17, he had a summer job as a barman in the Grand Hotel in Tramore, County Waterford, working from six in the evening to two in the morning. He spent his days on the beach, reading The Essential Hemingway, the copy of which he still professes to have, its "pages stained with seawater". The book developed in him a fascination with Spain, led to a wish to visit that country, and gave him "an idea of prose as something glamorous, smart and shaped, and the idea of character in fiction as something oddly mysterious, worthy of sympathy and admiration, but also elusive. And more than anything, the sheer pleasure of the sentences and their rhythms, and the amount of emotion living in what was not said, what was between the words and the sentences."

Eavan Boland introduced him to the poetry of Louise Glück while Boland and Tóibín were at Stanford together in the 2000s. Tóibín stated in 2017 that "there are a few books of mine that I have written since then that I don't think I could have written had it not been for that encounter". When Glück was awarded the 2020 Nobel Prize in Literature, Tóibin immediately wrote an article in praise of her and had it published.

Writing
Tóibín has said his writing comes out of silence. He does not favour story and does not view himself as storyteller. He has said, "Ending a novel is almost like putting a child to sleep – it can't be done abruptly." When working on a first draft he covers only the right-hand side of the page; later he carries out some rewriting on the left-hand side of the page. He keeps a word processor in another room on which to transfer writing at a later time.

He writes in great discomfort, saying in 2017: "When you're writing, you should be bent over, and you need to be in pain and your shoulders should be bent — you need to be pulling things up from within yourself. You can't be too comfortable".

His 1990 novel The South was followed by The Heather Blazing (1992), The Story of the Night (1996) and The Blackwater Lightship (1999). His fifth novel, The Master (2004), is a fictional account of part of the inner life of Henry James. U.S. writer Cynthia Ozick said his "rendering of the first hints, or sensations, of the tales as they form in James's thoughts is itself an instance of writer's wizardry". 2012 brought the publication of The Testament of Mary. In 2014, he released his first full-length novel since Brooklyn (2009), a portrait of a recently widowed mother of four in Wexford struggling through a period of grief, entitled Nora Webster.

Tóibín has written two short story collections. His first, Mothers and Sons, which — as the name suggests — explores the relationship between mothers and their sons, was published in 2006, and was reviewed favourably (including by Pico Iyer in The New York Times). His second, broader collection, titled The Empty Family, was published in 2010. It was shortlisted for the 2011 Frank O'Connor International Short Story Award.

Tóibín has written many non-fiction books, including Bad Blood: A Walk Along the Irish Border (1994), (reprinted from the 1987 original edition) and The Sign of the Cross: Travels in Catholic Europe (1994). He has written for the London Review of Books, The New York Review of Books and The Dublin Review, amongst other publications. Asked in 2021, how many articles he had written, Tóibín was uncertain: "I suppose thousands might be accurate". His article writing also contributed to his reputation as a literary critic: he edited a book on Paul Durcan, The Kilfenora Teaboy (1997), and The Penguin Book of Irish Fiction (1999); and wrote The Modern Library: The 200 Best Novels in English since 1950 (1999), with Carmen Callil.  He wrote a collection of essays, Love in a Dark Time: Gay Lives from Wilde to Almodóvar (2002), and a study on Lady Gregory, Lady Gregory's Toothbrush (2002). In his 2012 essay collection New Ways to Kill Your Mother: Writers and Their Families he studies the biographies of James Baldwin, J. M. Synge, and W. B. Yeats, amongst others. In 2015, he released On Elizabeth Bishop, a critical study which made The Guardians Best Books of 2015 list twice. In June 2016, Tóibín visited Israel, as part of a project by the "Breaking the Silence" organization, to write an article for a book on the Israeli occupation, to mark the 50th anniversary of the Six-Day War. The book was edited by Michael Chabon and Ayelet Waldman, and was published in June 2017 under the title Kingdom of Olives and Ash: Writers Confront the Occupation.

Tóibín's play, Beauty in a Broken Place, was staged in Dublin in August 2004. He first wrote poetry while attending secondary school in Wexford. In 2011, The Times Literary Supplement published his poem "Cush Gap, 2007". The December 2021 issue of The New York Review of Books included his poem "Father & Son", which may be autobiographical (as the description of the son's developing stammer in the second stanza—particularly on hard consonants—is similar to Tóibín's description of his own stammer).

His personal notes and work books are deposited at the National Library of Ireland.

Lecturing
Tóibín has been visiting professor at Stanford University, The University of Texas at Austin and Princeton University. He has also lectured at several other universities, including Middlebury College, Boston College, New York University, Loyola University Maryland, and The College of the Holy Cross. In 2017 he lectured in Athens, Georgia as the University of Georgia Chair for Global Understanding. He was a professor of creative writing at the University of Manchester, succeeding Martin Amis in that post, and currently teaches at Columbia University.

Commenting on the absence of gay students from his lectures, Tóibín said: "Whatever aura I have, it’s not as a gay guru—I'm not Edmund White. 'My mother's reading your book'—I get that a lot".

In 2015, ahead of a referendum on marriage in Ireland, Tóibín delivered a talk titled "The Embrace of Love: Being Gay in Ireland Now" in Trinity Hall, featuring Roger Casement's diaries, the work of Oscar Wilde, John Broderick and Kate O'Brien, and Senator David Norris's 1980s High Court battles.

He was appointed Chancellor of the University of Liverpool in 2017.

Publishing imprint
Tóibín jointly runs the Dublin-based publishing imprint, Tuskar Rock Press, with his agent Peter Straus.

Themes
Tóibín's work explores a number of main themes: the depiction of Irish society, living in exile, the legacy of Catholicism, the process of creativity, and the preservation of a personal identity, masculinity, fatherhood and homosexual identity, and on personal identity when confronted by loss. The "Wexford" novels (The Heather Blazing and The Blackwater Lightship) use Enniscorthy, the town of Tóibín's birth, as narrative material, together with the history of Ireland and the death of his father. An autobiographical account and reflection on this episode can be found in the non-fiction book, The Sign of the Cross. In 2009, he published Brooklyn, a tale of a woman emigrating to Brooklyn from Enniscorthy; characters from that novel also appear in Nora Webster, in which the young character of Donal seems to have been part-based on Colm's own childhood. Two other novels, The Story of the Night and The Master, revolve around characters who have to deal with a homosexual identity and take place outside Ireland for the most part, with a character having to cope with living abroad. His first novel, The South, seems to have ingredients of both lines of work. It can be read together with The Heather Blazing as a diptych of Protestant and Catholic heritages in County Wexford, or it can be grouped with the "living abroad" novels. A third topic that links The South and The Heather Blazing is that of creation, of painting in the first case and of the careful wording of a judge's verdict in the second. This third thematic line culminated in The Master, a study on identity, preceded by a non-fiction book on the same subject, Love in a Dark Time. The book of short stories Mothers and Sons deals with family themes, both in Ireland and Catalonia, and homosexuality. As described by The New Yorker in 2021, his characters are "careful in conversation, each utterance fraught with importance... [his] novels typically depict an unfinished battle between those who know what they feel and those who don't, between those who have found a taut peace within themselves and those who remain unsettled. His prose relies on economical gestures and moments of listening, and is largely shorn of metaphor and explanation".

Tóibín has written gay sex into several novels, and Brooklyn contains a heterosexual sex scene in which the heroine loses her virginity.

Bernard Schwartz informed Tóibin after The Magician was published that eight of his novels feature "someone tak[ing] a swim in cold water and hesitat[ing] before they go in" – Thomas Mann, the protagonist in The Magician, is sent swimming in the Baltic Sea. Tóibín had not previously noticed this.

Awards and honours
Tóibín's fellow artists elected him to Aosdána, which is supported by the Arts Council.

Arts Council director Mary Cloake called Tóibín "a champion of minorities" as he collected the 2011 Irish PEN Award.

In 2017, Tóibin objected to the wording of an Arts Council letter, which was attempting to regulate artists and force them to produce a constant supply of work if they wanted to be paid a basic income (which would also be withdrawn if they were "temporarily incapacitated due to ill-health"). Tóibín wrote: "The first problem with this, as I'm sure you will agree, is that the phrase 'working artists engaged in productive practice' sounds oddly North Korean, or is like a phrase that could have been used by Stalin about recalcitrant farmers in the Soviet Union." Tóibín noted that W. B. Yeats had heart disease which incapacitated him in later life, yet days before his death, he wrote his poem "Cuchulain Comforted", which Tóibín called "one of the greatest poems in the English language." Tóibín also enquired of the Arts Council: "In the case of James Joyce, who 'produced' nothing between 1922 and 1939, what would you have done?" He referred to his personal experience with another writer: "I draw your attention to the fact that John McGahern published no novel between 1979 and 1990. I know, because I was in regular touch with him during some of those years, how much he struggled, but he 'produced' no novel... would you really have sent 'auditors' down to Leitrim to do 'a sample audit' of what he was doing?"

In 2011, John Naughton, of The Observer, included Tóibín in his list of Britain's three hundred "public figures leading our cultural discourse" — despite Tóibín being Irish.

1993: Encore Award for a second novel, The Heather Blazing
1999: Booker Prize shortlist, for The Blackwater Lightship
2001: International Dublin Literary Award shortlist, for The Blackwater Lightship
2004: Booker Prize shortlist, for The Master
2004: Los Angeles Times Book Prize for Fiction, for The Master
2004: The New York Times, as one of the ten most notable books of the year, for The Master
2005: Lambda Literary Award, for The Master
2005: Stonewall Book Award, for The Master
2006: International Dublin Literary Award, for The Master
2007: Elected Fellow of the Royal Society of Literature
2008: Honorary degree of Doctor of Letters (D.Litt) from the University of Ulster, in recognition of his contribution to contemporary Irish literature
2009: Booker Prize longlist, for Brooklyn
2009: Costa Novel Award, for Brooklyn
2010: Awarded the 38th annual AWB Vincent American Ireland Fund Literary Award
2011: International Dublin Literary Award shortlist, for Brooklyn
2011: Irish PEN Award, for contribution to Irish literature
2011: Frank O'Connor International Short Story Award shortlist, for The Empty Family.
2013: Booker Prize shortlist, for The Testament of Mary
2014: Named as a trustee to The Griffin Trust For Excellence in Poetry, which awards the Griffin Poetry Prize
2015: Hawthornden Prize, for Nora Webster
2017: The Dayton Literary Peace Prize Richard C. Holbrooke Distinguished Achievement Award
2017: Honorary doctorate from the Open University, for services to the arts and sciences
2017: The Kenyon Review Award for Literary Achievement
2019: Premio Malaparte (Italy)
2019: Bob Hughes Lifetime Achievement Award
2021: Notable Book, Critics' Top Book, and Top 10 Book of Historical Fiction by The New York Times, for The Magician
2021: Best Book of the Year by NPR, The Washington Post and The Wall Street Journal, for The Magician
2021: David Cohen Prize for Literature
2022: Folio Prize, for The Magician

Selected bibliography

Novels
 
 
 
 
 
 
 
 
 
The Magician, Viking, 2021,

Short fiction
Collections
 
 
Stories

Non-fiction
  (republished in 1994 without photographs as Bad Blood).
 
 
  (revised edition Picador, 2002)
 
 
 
 
 
 
 
  (First English edition; Australian edition published 2001)
 The Irish Famine. A Documentary. With Diarmaid Ferriter, Profile Books Limited, 2001.

Book reviews

Filmography
 2017 Return to Montauk (writer)
 2015 Brooklyn

See also

 LGBT culture in New York City
 List of LGBT people from New York City

Notes

References

Sources
 Ryan, Ray. Ireland and Scotland: Literature and Culture, State and Nation, 1966–2000. Oxford University Press, 2002.

Further reading
 Allen Randolph, Jody. "Colm Tóibín, December 2009." Close to the Next Moment. Manchester: Carcanet, 2010.
 Boland, Eavan. "Colm Tóibín." Irish Writers on Writing. San Antonio: Trinity University Press, 2007.
 Costello-Sullivan, Kathleen. Mother/Country: Politics of the Personal in the Fiction of Colm Tóibín. Reimagining Ireland series. Ed. Eamon Maher. Bern: Peter Lang, 2012.
 Cronin, Michael G. 'Revolutionary Bodies: homoeroticism and the political imagination in Irish Writing'. Manchester University Pres, 2022.
 Delaney, Paul. Reading Colm Tóibín. Dublin: Liffey Press, 2008, 
 Educational Media Solutions, 'Reading Ireland, Contemporary Irish Writers in the Context of Place', 2012, Films Media Group

External links

 
 Colm Tóibín at Aosdána
 
 Contributions by Tóibín to The New York Review of Books (article archive)
 Biographical profile at The Guardian
 Contributions by Tóibín to The Guardian (article archive)
 Tóibín receiving the 2011 Irish PEN Award – photo credit Alan Betson / The Irish Times
 Interview at Desert Island Discs (BBC Radio 4, first broadcast 7 January 2016)
 

1955 births
Living people
Alumni of University College Dublin
Aosdána members
Chancellors of the University of Liverpool
Columbia University faculty
David Cohen Prize recipients
Fellows of the Royal Society of Literature
Irish essayists
Irish gay writers
Irish historical novelists
Irish journalists
Irish male dramatists and playwrights
Irish male non-fiction writers
Irish male novelists
Irish male poets
Irish male short story writers
Irish PEN Award for Literature winners
Irish LGBT poets
Irish LGBT dramatists and playwrights
Irish LGBT journalists
Irish LGBT novelists
Lambda Literary Award for Gay Fiction winners
Magill people
Male essayists
People educated at St Peter's College, Wexford
People from Enniscorthy
Stonewall Book Award winners
Sunday Independent (Ireland) people
The Guardian journalists
The New York Review of Books people
The New Yorker people
The Observer people
Gay poets
Gay dramatists and playwrights
Gay novelists
20th-century essayists
20th-century Irish male writers
20th-century Irish novelists
20th-century Irish short story writers
20th-century Irish LGBT people
21st-century Irish dramatists and playwrights
21st-century essayists
21st-century Irish male writers
21st-century Irish novelists
21st-century Irish short story writers
21st-century Irish LGBT people
Writers of historical fiction set in the modern age